General, in comics, may refer to:

 General (DC Comics), a Batman villain
 General Wade Eiling, who has gone by the alias The General
 General, a Marvel Comics supervillain and opponent of Sentry

It may also refer to:

 August General in Iron, a DC Comics Chinese superhero and member of the Great Ten
 General Glory, two DC Comics characters
 General Ross, a Marvel Comics character and opponent of the Hulk
 General Zahl, a DC Comics supervillain
 General Zod, a DC Comics supervillain and enemy of Superman

See also
General (disambiguation)

References